Počepice is a municipality and village in Příbram District in the Central Bohemian Region of the Czech Republic. It has about 500 inhabitants.

Administrative parts
Villages of Oukřtalov, Rovina, Skuhrov and Vitín are administrative parts of Počepice.

References

Villages in Příbram District